Bouchercon is an annual convention of creators and devotees of mystery and detective fiction. It is named in honour of writer, reviewer, and editor Anthony Boucher; also the inspiration for the Anthony Awards, which have been issued at the convention since 1986. This page details Bouchercon XLIV and the 2013 Anthony Awards ceremony.

Bouchercon 
The convention was held at Albany, New York from 19–23 September 2013. The event was chaired by Al Abramson.

Special guests 
 Lifetime Achievement: Sue Grafton
 International Guest of Honor: Anne Perry
 American Guest of Honor: Tess Gerritsen
 Toastmaster: Steve Hamilton
 Fan Guests of Honor: Chris Aldrich & Lynn Kaczmarek
 The David Thompson Memorial Special Service Award: Marv Lachman

Anthony Awards 
The following list details the awards distributed at the 2013 annual Anthony Awards ceremony.

Best Novel 
Winner:
 Louise Penny, The Beautiful Mystery
Shortlist:
 Megan Abbott, Dare Me
 Sean Chercover, The Trinity Game
 Gillian Flynn, Gone Girl
 Hank Phillippi Ryan, The Other Woman

Best First Novel 
Winner:
 Chris Pavone, The Expats
Shortlist:
 Daniel Friedman, Don’t Ever Get Old
 Owen Laukkanen - The Professionals
 Matthew Quirk - The 500
 Michael Sears, Black Fridays

Best Paperback Original 
Winner:
 Johnny Shaw, Big Maria
Shortlist:
 Lou Berney, Whiplash River
 Joelle Charbonneau, Murder for Choir
 Alison Gaylin, And She Was
 Malla Nunn, Blessed are the Dead

Best Short Story 
Winner:
 Dana Cameron, "Mischief in Mesopotamia" from Ellery Queen's Mystery Magazine
Shortlist:
 Sheila Connolly, "Kept in the Dark" from Best New England Crime Stories: Blood Moon
 Barb Goffman, "The Lord is My Shamus" from Chesapeake Crimes: This Job is Murder
 Todd Robinson, "Peaches" from Grift, Spring 2012
 Karin Slaughter, "The Unremarkable Heart" from Mystery Writers of America Presents: Vengeance

Best Critical Non-fiction Work 
Winner:
 John Connolly and Declan Burke, Books to Die For: The World’s Greatest Mystery Writers on the World’s Greatest Mystery Novels
Shortlist:
 Joseph Goodrich, Blood Relations: The Selected Letters of Ellery Queen, 1947-1950
 D.P. Lyle, M.D., More Forensics and Fiction: Crime Writers Morbidly Curious Questions Expertly Answered
 Mathew Prichard, The Grand Tour: Around the World with the Queen of Mystery Agatha Christie
 Otto Penzler, In Pursuit of Spenser: Mystery Writers on Robert B. Parker and the Creation of an American Hero

External links 
 Official Website

References 

Anthony Awards
44